Belal Chowdhury (12 November 1938 – 24 April 2018) was a Bangladeshi poet. He was awarded the Bangla Academy Literary Award in 1984, the Mazharul Islam Poetry Award in 2013 and Ekushey Padak in 2014.

Career
Chowdhury served Bharat Bichitra as its editor published from Indian embassy in Dhaka. He was also an editor of the Shaptahik Sandwip published by Rupali Group and Krittibas, a Bengali poetry magazine, edited by Sunil Gangopadhyay.

References

1938 births
2018 deaths
People from Feni District
Bangladeshi male poets
Recipients of Bangla Academy Award
Recipients of the Ekushey Padak
People from Noakhali District
Recipients of Mazharul Islam Poetry Award